Vladimir Izdebskiy was a sculptor born on June 3, 1882 in Kiev, Ukraine. He attended Odessa Art School from 1901 to 1903. In 1903 he moved to Munich to study at the Academy of Art. After taking part in the 1905  Russian uprisings he was expelled from the school. He then moved to Russia. In 1907 he returned to Odessa and began to give drawing lessons. He also started creating sculptures at that time. In 1909 Vladimir formed the Izdebskiy Salon, a place where artists from Russia and abroad could meet. He later fled from Petrograd to reunite with the rest of his family in Paris. In 1941, during World War ll, Vladimir fled France and lived in New York  from that point on. He died August 20, 1965.

References

1882 births
1965 deaths
20th-century Russian sculptors
20th-century Russian male artists
Russian male sculptors